Walking with Thee is the second studio album by British indie rock band Clinic. It was released on 25 February 2002 on Domino Records.

Walking with Thee was included in Rolling Stone's "50 Best Albums of 2002". It was nominated for the Grammy Award for Best Alternative Music Album in 2003, losing out to Coldplay's A Rush of Blood to the Head.

Track listing

Personnel
Clinic
Ade Blackburn – keyboard, melodica, lead vocals
Brian Campbell – bass, flute, backing vocals
Jonathan Hartley – lead guitar, clarinet, keyboards
Carl Turney – drums, piano, backing vocals, additional percussion

Production
Clinic – production
Ben Hillier – production

Charts

References

External links

"Home entertainment" (The Guardian, 1 March 2002)

2002 albums
Clinic (band) albums
Domino Recording Company albums
Albums produced by Ben Hillier